The Ireland women's cricket team played the Netherlands women's cricket team in July 2021. The tour consisted of four Women's Twenty20 International (WT20I) matches, with all the fixtures being played at The Village, Dublin. Ireland's last international matches were in May 2021 against Scotland, while the Netherlands last played an international match in August 2019. Heather Siegers was named as the captain of the Dutch team for the series, replacing Juliët Post.

Ireland won the first match of the series by 28 runs. The second match of the series was originally scheduled to take place on 27 July 2021, but was moved to the reserve day after no play was possible due to rain. However, no play was possible on the reserve day either, with the match being abandoned due to the weather. Ireland won the third match by six wickets to win the series with a game to play. In the match, Ireland's Laura Delany broke the captaincy record for her team, leading them for the 63rd time, passing Isobel Joyce's record of 62 matches as captain. The Netherlands won the fourth match by seven wickets, to record their first ever win against Ireland in WT20I cricket, with Ireland winning the series 2–1.

Squads

Amy Hunter was also named in Ireland's squad as a COVID-19 reserve.

WT20I series

1st WT20I

2nd WT20I

3rd WT20I

4th WT20I

References

External links
 Series home at ESPN Cricinfo

2021 in women's cricket
2021 in Irish cricket
2021 in Dutch cricket
International cricket competitions in 2021
Netherlands 2021
Ireland